Hydraethiops is a genus of snakes in the subfamily Natricinae of the family Colubridae. The genus is endemic to Central Africa.

Species
The genus Hydraethiops contains two species which are recognized as being valid.
Hydraethiops laevis 
Hydraethiops melanogaster  —  blackbelly snake

References

Further reading
Günther A (1872). "Seventh Account of new Species of Snakes in the Collection of the British Museum". Ann. Mag. Nat. Hist., Fourth Series 9: 13-37 + Plates III-VI. (Hydræthiops, new genus, p. 28; H. melanogaster, new species, p. 28 + Plate III, figure G).

Hydraethiops
Snake genera
Taxa named by Albert Günther